The National Civil Aviation Agency (NACA; , ANAC) is the civil aviation agency of Mauritania. Its head office is in Nouakchott.

It was established in 2004 under decree # 2004-079.

References

External links
 National Civil Aviation Agency
 National Civil Aviation Agency 
 National Civil Aviation Agency 

Civil aviation in Mauritania
Mauritania
Government of Mauritania
2004 establishments in Mauritania
Transport organisations based in Mauritania